Blayney Townley-Balfour or Blayney Townley Balfour may refer to:
 Blayney Townley-Balfour (Carlingford MP) (1705–1788), Irish politician
 Blayney Townley-Balfour (Belturbet MP) (1769–1856), Irish politician, grandson of the preceding
 Blayney Townley-Balfour (governor) (born 1799), son of the preceding, Governor of the Bahamas 1833–1835